Rosenbergiodendron longiflorum is a flowering plant in the family Rubiaceae. It is native to tropical South America.

References

Gardenieae
Flora of South America